AKB48 (pronounced A.K.B. Forty-eight) is a Japanese idol girl group named after the Akihabara (Akiba for short) area in Tokyo, where the group's theater is located. The group has expanded since then to include over 130 members , aged from their early teens to their mid-20s.

 For individual member's filmography, see their articles.

Music videos 
All songs credited to AKB48 except when otherwise stated in the Artist field.

Feature films 
 Densen Uta (2007)
 Mijyoubutsu Hyaku Monogatari (2021)

TV series 
 Japanorama Season 2, episode 2.
 Majisuka Gakuen (マジすか学園, "Serious High School") (TV Tokyo) (2010.01.08–2010.03.26)
 Sakura Kara no Tegami: AKB48 Sorezore no Sotsugyo Monogatari (桜からの手紙 〜AKB48 それぞれの卒業物語〜, Letters from Cherry Blossoms ~AKB48 Graduation Stories~) (NTV) (2011.02.26–2011.03.06)
 Shiritsu Bakaleya Kōkō (私立バカレア高校) (NTV) (2012.04.14–2012.06.30)
 Majisuka Gakuen 2 (マジすか学園2) (TV Tokyo) (2011.04.15–2011.07.01)
 Majisuka Gakuen 3 (マジすか学園3) (TV Tokyo) (2012.07.13–2012.10.05)
 So long! (NTV) (2013.02.11–2013.02.13)
 Wanda × AKB48 Short Story: Fortune Cookie (Fuji TV) (2013.07.07)
 Majisuka Gakuen 4 (マジすか学園4) (NTV) (2015.01.19–2015.3.30)
 Majisuka Gakuen 5 (マジすか学園5) (NTV and Hulu Japan) (2015.08.25–2015.10.27)
 AKB Horror Night: Adrenaline no Yoru (Asahi TV and au Video Pass) (2015.10.08-2016.03.03) 
 AKB Love Night: Koi Kōjo (Asahi TV and au Video Pass) (2016.04.21-2016.09.15)
 Kyabasuka Gakuen
 Tōfu Pro Wrestling (Asahi TV) (2017.01.22-2017.07.02)
 Majimuri Gakuen
 AKB48 no Uta

TV shows

Web dramas 
 Suzuki Wagon R presents Kissa Versailles (2007.3.14–5.7)
All AKB48 old Team K members appear; former member Ayumi Orii as a star.
 AKB48 Sōsenkyo Scandal: Akiba Bunshō on Amazon Prime Video, 5 episodes (2016.6.19 onwards)
 Crow's Blood on Hulu Japan, 6 episodes (2016.7.23 onwards)

Video games 
  (PSP), a dating simulation game.
  (PSP), a sequel to the previous dating simulation game. It is set on the island of Guam.
 AKB48 Stage Fighter (Smartphone)
 AKB48 Trading Card Game & Collection (AR Card Game)
 AKB48 + Me (Nintendo 3DS)
  (PSP, PSV and PS3), a sequel to the two previous dating sims that features all the AKB, SKE, NMB and HKT members.
  (Smartphone, PC)
 Sailor Zombie AKB48 Arcade Edition (Arcade)
 AKB48 Office Music Game (Smartphone)
 AiKaBu (Smartphone)
 AKB48 Stage Fighter 2 Battle Festival (Smartphone)
 AKB48 Dice Caravan (Smartphone)
  (Smartphone)
 AKB48 Beat Carnival (Smartphone)
 AKB48 Cherry Bay Blaze (Smartphone)
  (Smartphone)
 AKB48 WORLD'' (Smartphone)

Notes

References

Japanese filmographies